Zaovine is a village located in the municipality of Bajina Bašta, Serbia. According to the 2011 census, the village has a population of 263 inhabitants. The whole territory of the village is a part of the Tara National park and is in close proximity of the Zaovine Lake.

Gallery

References

External links

Populated places in Zlatibor District